Saccharopolyspora taberi is a bacterium from the genus Saccharopolyspora which has been isolated from soil in Texas in the United States.

References

 

Pseudonocardineae
Bacteria described in 1987